Auxiliary Medical Service (AMS) is a voluntary medical and health services provider in Hong Kong. Its mission is to supply effectively and efficiently regular services to maintain the health and well-being of people in Hong Kong.

History

The Hong Kong Government decided to form the Auxiliary Medical Service in order to create a force that could assist the regular medical services during emergencies. The establishment of the AMS was announced in the government gazette on 22 December 1950. In early 1951 the AMS made a call for volunteers, including ordinary people who could be trained as auxiliary nurses, ambulance drivers, and other roles. As the population of Hong Kong swelled with refugees from China in the post-Chinese Communist Revolution years, many lived in substandard housing areas susceptible to fires, landslips, storms, and other disasters, for which the AMS played a role in delivering emergency medical treatment. In the 1950s, AMS worked with St. John Ambulance to establish first aid posts all around the territory.

The AMS was involved in major events like the Shek Kip Mei Fire in 1953, Typhoon Wendy in 1962 and landslides caused by heavy rainstorms in 1972. It also served during SARS in Hong Kong in 2003 and 2004 Indian Ocean earthquake. Normally, it sends out volunteers to fireworks displays, marathons, and other major events.

In 1983, AMS became an independent government operation branch under the Security Department of the Government Secretariat. A public hotline for enquiry about the services of AMS and a Non-Emergency Ambulance Transport team were set up in 1995 and 1996 respectively. The Youth Ambassador Scheme has also been implemented in 1997 with the objectives to encourage young people to have a healthy lifestyle and promote a sense of civic duties.

As of 2007, the number of volunteers had grown to 4,418.

Fleet

A list of vehicles used in the past and present:

Past
 Land Rover Defender ambulances
 Mercedes-Benz T1 E-310 ambulances
 Toyota Coaster ambulance
 Honda CBX750 motorcycle
 BMW R850RT motorcycle

Present
 Mercedes-Benz Sprinter 516CDI ambulance
 Mitsubishi Fuso Rosa ambulance
 BMW R900RT motorcycle
 Nissan Urvan Mobile Command Post (MCP)
 Merida Mountain Bike (CRU)

Organisation

The Auxiliary Medical Service has over 4,700 uniformed members, and is divided into six columns:
 HQ Column
 Operations Wing 1
 Hong Kong Island Operating Region
 Kowloon East Operating Region
 Kowloon West Operating Region
 Operations Wing 2
 New Territories East Operating Region
 New Territories West Operating Region
 Training and Development Column
 Medical and Paramedic Column
 Logistics and Support Column

The headquarters column is composed of civil service staff of the AMS.

The operations wings are responsible for frontline work and account for the majority of members.

The training and development column is responsible for providing first aid, evacuation, and infection control training to all members.

The medical and paramedic column is responsible for the Health Protection Section (HPU), Emergency Task Force, and Reserve Personnel Section. Its members are professional doctors, nurses, and professionally trained personnel. In the event of a major incident, the medical and paramedic column will provide personnel to lead in rescue and medical efforts.

The logistics and support column is responsible for the delivery of materials and members to stations and incidents, as well as the welfare of members of the AMS. Public relations and the Band of the AMS are also the responsibility of the logistics and support column.

Emergency cycling team

The First Aid Bicycle Team was established in 2002. First aid cyclists provide first aid services on Saturdays, Sundays and public holidays for people travelling to Tai Po, Ma On Shan, and Shatin.

The First Aid Bicycle Team is divided into the following sections:
 Shatin Section
 Ma On Shan Section
 Whitehead Section
 Tai Po Section
 Tai Po Seaside Section
 Sheung Shui Section

Crest

The current crest of the force was adopted in 1997 to replace most of the colonial symbols on the old crest (c. 1950):

 St Edward's Crown replaced with Bauhinia
 Laurel wreath retained but wording AMS replaced with "醫療輔助隊"
 Motto with wording "Hong Kong" replaced with "Auxiliary Medical Services"

Source: Auxiliary Medical Service (Hong Kong)

Auxiliary Medical Service Cadet Corps

References

External links 

 

1950 establishments in Hong Kong
Emergency medical services in Hong Kong
Medical and health organisations based in Hong Kong
Organizations established in 1950
Medical volunteerism